Charles Ellsworth Goodell Jr. (March 16, 1926January 21, 1987) was an American politician who represented New York in the United States House of Representatives from 1959 to 1968 and the United States Senate from 1968 to 1971. In both cases he came into office following the deaths of his predecessors, first in a special election and second as a temporary appointee succeeding Robert F. Kennedy.

He was elected to four full terms in Congress after winning his first race in 1959. He resigned on September 9, 1968, to accept an appointment by Governor Nelson Rockefeller to fill the vacancy caused by the assassination of United States Senator Robert F. Kennedy on June 5, 1968. Having earned the support of both the Republican and Liberal parties in 1970, he lost in a three-way race to Conservative Party candidate James L. Buckley, having split the liberal vote with Democratic Party candidate Richard Ottinger.

Goodell was the father of National Football League Commissioner Roger Goodell.

Early life and education
Goodell was born in Jamestown, New York, the son of Francesca (née Bartlett) and Charles Ellsworth Goodell. He attended the public schools of Jamestown and graduated from Williams College as a member of Phi Beta Kappa in 1948. He served in the United States Navy during the World War II era as a seaman second class (1944–46) and in the United States Air Force as a first lieutenant (1952–53) during the Korean War.

Goodell received an LL.B. from Yale Law School in 1951 and an M.A. in government from Yale in 1952. He briefly taught at Quinnipiac College in 1952. Following his admission to the Connecticut bar (1951) and the New York bar (1954), he began his law practice in Jamestown. He was a great-grandson of William Goodell, an abolitionist.

Congressional career
Goodell was a congressional liaison assistant for the Department of Justice in 1954–1955. He won a special election on May 26, 1959, as a Republican to the 86th United States Congress to fill the vacancy caused by the death of Daniel A. Reed. In NY District 43, Goodell polled 27,454 votes (65 percent) to the Democrat Robert E. McCaffery's 14,250 ballots (33.8 percent).

Goodell was re-elected in November 1960 to the 87th Congress, and re-elected three times thereafter. During his tenure in the House, Goodell voted in favor of the Civil Rights Acts of 1960, 1964, and 1968, and the Voting Rights Act of 1965, but voted against the 24th Amendment to the U.S. Constitution. He resigned on September 9, 1968, to accept Governor Nelson A. Rockefeller's appointment to the United States Senate, filling the vacancy caused by the assassination of United States Senator Robert F. Kennedy on June 6, 1968. Because a special election to fill the vacancy would not be held for over two years, public objection to the length of Goodell's appointment led to a failed legal challenge to the Governor's power to appoint Senators in the event of a vacancy, Valenti v. Rockefeller.

Although he had been a moderate to conservative member in the House, as a Senator he was nearly as liberal as New York's other Republican Senator, Jacob K. Javits. In the Senate, Goodell authored and sponsored a large number of bills, including several to provide conservation and development aid to small towns and rural areas. Many small upstate New York communities without municipal sewage systems built them with the aid of federal matching funds provided by Goodell's legislation. He "joined the quasi-pacifist Oregon senator Mark Hatfield as the loudest anti-Vietnam War voices in the Republican Party." Anti-war protesters and activists praised his advocacy of a withdrawal from Vietnam.

In 1970, the New York Republican Party was split deeply over the issue of the Second New Right conservatism of much of the grassroots support for the party versus the perceived liberalism of the party organization, leadership, and Governor Rockefeller himself. While Rockefeller's supporters were strong enough within the party and its regular organization to assure Goodell's receiving the party's nomination for what would be his first full term, conservative activists left the party en masse to support someone farther to the right. Additionally, then Vice-President Spiro T. Agnew, alluding to Goodell's shift from moderate-conservative Republican to liberal Republican, went so far as to call him the "Christine Jorgensen of the Republican Party," analogizing his ideological shift to Jorgensen's highly publicized gender reassignment. Goodell was not discouraged. Running under the slogan "Senator Goodell — He's too good to lose", he received the nomination of the Liberal Party as well as that of the regular Republican organization, an electoral fusion allowed under New York law.

One television ad aired by Goodell's campaign just before election day in 1970 contrasted his record with his two opponents. A voice over the graphics said "New York voters face real choices in this year's Senate election: Congressman Richard Ottinger, the Democratic candidate, who has sponsored two pieces of legislation in six years in the House. Republican Senator Charles Goodell, who has sponsored forty-four major pieces of legislation in twenty-two months in the Senate. Conservative nominee James L. Buckley, who has an economic plan for the nineteenth century. Those are your choices on election day: the light weight; the heavy weight; and the dead weight."

In the November 1970 election, despite Rockefeller's support and that of the Republican and Liberal parties, Goodell split the liberal vote with Ottinger, and was defeated by  Conservative Party candidate Buckley. Goodell finished third, with 24.3 percent of the vote.

Goodell would be the last appointed U.S. Senator from New York until 2009, when Kirsten Gillibrand was selected to replace Hillary Clinton, who had been appointed Secretary of State by President Barack Obama.

Life after leaving Congress
After leaving Congress, Goodell resumed the practice of law. In the mid-1970s, Goodell served as Vice-Chairman, with former Pennsylvania Governor William Scranton as Chairman, of President Gerald Ford's committee to draft rules for granting amnesty to Vietnam War-era draft evaders and deserters.

Goodell was a resident of Washington, D.C. and Bronxville, New York, until his death on January 21, 1987. He was buried at Lakeview Cemetery in Jamestown.

Books 
 Goodell, Charles E. Political Prisoners in America. New York: Random House, 1973.

References

External links

1926 births
1987 deaths
Politicians from Jamestown, New York
Military personnel from New York (state)
United States Navy personnel of World War II
Williams College alumni
Yale Law School alumni
Quinnipiac University faculty
Connecticut lawyers
New York (state) lawyers
Lawyers from Washington, D.C.
Republican Party United States senators from New York (state)
Republican Party members of the United States House of Representatives from New York (state)
Writers from New York (state)
20th-century American lawyers
20th-century American politicians
United States Navy sailors
United States Air Force personnel of the Korean War
United States Air Force officers